Out of the Ashes is a 2010 British documentary film directed by Tim Albone, Lucy Martens and Leslie Knott. It documents the story of the Afghanistan national cricket team's qualification for the 2010 ICC World Twenty20 tournament.

References

External links
 

2010 films
2010 documentary films
Cricket in Afghanistan
Cricket films
2010s English-language films
British sports documentary films
2010s British films
English-language documentary films